Zaragoza is a district of the Palmares canton, in the Alajuela province of Costa Rica.

Geography 
Zaragoza has an area of  km2 and an elevation of  metres.

Demographics 

For the 2011 census, Zaragoza had a population of  inhabitants.

Transportation

Road transportation 
The district is covered by the following road routes:
 National Route 135
 National Route 713
 National Route 714
 National Route 715

References 

Districts of Alajuela Province
Populated places in Alajuela Province